This is list of German language exonyms for places in multilingual and fully non-German-speaking areas of Switzerland.

Complete list of names

See also 
 German exonyms
 List of European exonyms

German
Switz